Muhammad bin Nayef Al Saud (born 30 August 1959), colloquially known by his initials MBN or MbN, is a former Saudi Arabian politician and businessman who served as the crown prince and first deputy prime minister of Saudi Arabia from 2015 to 2017 and as the minister of interior from 2012 to 2017.

Prince Muhammad is a grandson of the founding monarch, King Abdulaziz, and son of the former crown prince Nayef bin Abdulaziz. Muhammad and Nayef were the first father-son duo in Saudi history to serve as crown prince. Muhammad's uncle King Salman named him as crown prince on 29 April 2015. On 21 June 2017 the king appointed his own son, Mohammed bin Salman, as crown prince and relieved Muhammad bin Nayef of all positions. He has been in detention since 6 March 2020 along with his uncle Ahmed and his half-brother Nawwaf.

Early life and education
Muhammad bin Nayef was born in Jeddah on 30 August 1959. He is one of ten children of Prince Nayef bin Abdulaziz, himself a son of King Abdulaziz and full brother of King Fahd and King Salman. Prince Muhammad has an older brother, Saud bin Nayef, and two younger half-brothers, Nawwaf bin Nayef and Fahd bin Nayef. His mother, Al Jawhara bint Abdulaziz bin Musaed, was a member of the Al Jiluwi branch of the House of Saud. She died in July 2019.

Muhammad bin Nayef studied in the United States. There he received a bachelor's degree in political science in 1981. He took courses at Lewis & Clark College, but did not receive a degree. He attended the FBI's security courses from 1985 to 1988, and trained with Scotland Yard's anti-terrorism units from 1992 to 1994.

Career

Muhammad bin Nayef was appointed assistant interior minister for security affairs in 1999. He had been a businessman before this appointment. He was widely credited for the success of the Ministry's counter-terrorism program. He was regarded as the architect of the government's counter-insurgency program. He also served as the director of civil defense during his term as assistant minister. He was considered to be an effective assistant interior minister.

In 2004, Muhammad bin Nayef was appointed to the rank of minister, becoming number two at the Ministry of Interior. In October 2010, he warned the U.S. Deputy National Security Adviser of the 2010 cargo plane bomb plot. After the appointment of Prince Ahmed bin Abdulaziz Al Saud as interior minister upon the death of Prince Nayef in July 2012, Prince Muhammad became deputy interior minister.

In November 2009, King Abdullah appointed Muhammad as a member of the influential Supreme Economic Council of Saudi Arabia. This move was regarded as approval of the increase in then-Crown Prince Nayef's power by King Abdullah. On the other hand, this appointment enabled Prince Muhammad to extend his influence over the government's economy policy.

On 5 November 2012, King Abdullah issued a royal decree and dismissed Prince Ahmed as minister of interior and appointed Prince Muhammad to the post. He became the tenth interior minister of Saudi Arabia. Prince Muhammad took the oath of office in front of King Abdullah on 6 November 2012. His appointment was not regarded very positively by human rights activists due to Prince Muhammad's professional experience as a tough enforcer who imprisoned thousands of suspected troublemakers in Saudi Arabia. However, he was regarded as less corrupt and less likely to abuse his power in comparison to other senior princes of his generation.

Prince Muhammad met with British Prime Minister David Cameron in January 2013. He then met with U.S. President Barack Obama in Washington, D.C. on 14 January 2013. They discussed issues of security and regional developments. In late January 2013, Prince Muhammad announced that Saudi women would be allowed to work at the Saudi intelligence agency.

In February 2014, Prince Muhammad replaced Bandar bin Sultan, then intelligence chief of Saudi Arabia, and was placed in charge of Saudi intelligence in Syria. Muhammad was assisted in this effort by Prince Mutaib bin Abdullah, the minister of the Saudi Arabian National Guard.

On 10 February 2017, the U.S. Central Intelligence Agency (CIA) granted its "George Tenet Medal" to Prince Muhammad for what the agency called his "excellent intelligence performance, in the domain of counter-terrorism and his unbound contribution to realize world security and peace". The medal, named after George Tenet, CIA's longest-serving director, from 1996 to 2004, was handed to him by the newly appointed CIA director Mike Pompeo during a reception ceremony in Riyadh in the presence of minister of defense Mohammed bin Salman Al Saud. It was the first reaffirmation of ties between the Islamic monarchy and United States since President Donald Trump took office on 20 January 2017. The reception was attended by senior civil and military officials and by the U.S. Charge d'affaires to the Kingdom, Christopher Hensel. Prince Muhammed and Pompeo discussed security with Turkish officials, and said Saudi Arabia's relationship with the U.S. is "historic and strategic". He added that the move shows Washington's recognition of what he called Riyadh's anti-terrorism efforts.

Deputy Crown Prince
On 23 January 2015 it was announced that King Salman had appointed Muhammad bin Nayef as deputy crown prince. The announcement reportedly helped calm fears of dynastic instability over the line of succession. Thus, Prince Muhammad became the first of his generation to be officially in line for the throne. In addition to his other posts Prince Muhammad was named the chair of the Council for Political and Security Affairs which was established on 29 January 2015.

War in Yemen

As chair of the Council for Political and Security Affairs, the Prince was a leading commander of Operation Decisive Storm, the first major Saudi military operation of the 21st century.

Crown Prince

On 29 April 2015, Muhammad bin Nayef was named Crown Prince, replacing Muqrin bin Abdulaziz in the post.

Ousting
Muhammad bin Nayef was deposed by royal decree on 21 June 2017, and the king's son Mohammed bin Salman was made heir presumptive to the throne. He was also relieved of all positions by royal decree. Abdulaziz bin Saud Al Saud replaced Prince Muhammad as minister of interior. The change of succession had been predicted in December 2015 by an unusually blunt and public memo published by the German Federal Intelligence Service, for which it was subsequently rebuked by the German government.

According to the New York Times, reports of "current and former United States officials and associates of the royal family" speaking on condition of anonymity, state that the ousting of Muhammad bin Nayef and his replacement by Mohammed bin Salman in late June 2017 was not "seamless", but involved Muhammad bin Nayef being "held against his will and pressured for hours to give up his claim to the throne". He was still being confined to his palace as of 19 July 2017. In addition, his bank accounts were blocked in late fall 2017. In reply, a Saudi official dismissed these reports as "unfounded and untrue in addition to being nonsense" and a "complete fantasy worthy of Hollywood," according to Reuters news agency. Following his removal his wife and daughters were forbidden from leaving Saudi Arabia.

Arrest
Muhammad bin Nayef, his half-brother Nawwaf bin Nayef and his uncle Ahmed bin Abdulaziz were arrested and charged with treason on 6 March 2020.

On 25 August 2020, the legal representatives of Muhammad bin Nayef raised concerns over his well-being, alleging that Saudi Arabian authorities have not allowed his doctor or his family members to visit him since his arrest five months earlier.

Views
Muhammad bin Nayef, unlike most of the royal family, actively talks to the media. Concerning the struggle against terrorism, he adopts a policy of the iron fist like his father, Prince Nayef. He, and other decision-making elites, have asserted that terrorism must be treated as a form of crime and fought with ruthless policing methods. Walid Jumblatt described Muhammad bin Nayef as the Saudi equivalent of General Ashraf Rifi, former director-general of Lebanon's Internal Security Forces.

Muhammad bin Nayef was commended by Western intelligence agencies for Saudi Arabia's counterterrorism programs. He called for a "security channel" with the United States to facilitate information exchange. He firmly supported U.S. President Barack Obama in his opposition to the release of detainee interrogation photographs. He thought that Yemen was a "dangerous failed state" and becoming a serious threat to Saudi Arabia. He further believed that Yemeni President Ali Abdullah Saleh was losing control. He suggested a strategy of directly working with Yemeni tribes, condemning terrorism.

He praised General Ashfaq Parvez Kayani, the Chief of Army Staff of Pakistan, as a "good man". He voiced his concerns regarding Iran's nuclear program. He defers foreign policy issues to the King. After his appointment as interior minister, U.S. diplomats argued that he is "the most pro-American minister in the Saudi Cabinet".

Influence
In 2011 The Economist described Prince Muhammad as energetic and low-key, and stated that he was one of the candidates for the throne when the line of succession passes to the grandsons of King Abdulaziz. He was also considered to be one of the possible contenders after his father's death in June 2012. In 2011, Michael Hayden reported that Prince Muhammad was the world's fifth most powerful defender. In April 2016, Prince Muhammad was named by Time as one of the 100 Most Influential People.

On 21 June 2017, Prince Muhammad bin Nayef was replaced as the heir to the Saudi Kingdom by Prince Mohammed bin Salman in a move considered to be "upending decades of royal custom and profoundly reordering the kingdom’s inner power structure." He also lost his position as interior minister. Over the last 15 years, Muhammad bin Nayef had been considered Saudi Arabia's most influential security official, maintaining close connections with American and British intelligence communities.

Assassination attempts
Muhammad bin Nayef has escaped four assassination attempts. He was injured in the third attempt, and unhurt in the others.

The third attempt was on 27 August 2009. Muhammad bin Nayef was injured by Abdullah al-Asiri, a suicide bomber linked to Al-Qaeda in the Arabian Peninsula. Al-Asiri spoke to Muhammad bin Nayef a few days prior to the bombing, and expressed a desire to surrender himself to the authorities as part of the country's terrorist rehabilitation program. This was apparently a plot to get admitted to the Prince's palace. Al-Asiri is believed to have traveled to Jeddah from the Yemeni province of Marib. During Ramadan, al-Asiri waited in line at the Prince's palace as a "well-wisher". He exploded a suicide bomb, killing himself, but apparently only slightly injuring Muhammad bin Nayef, who was protected from the full force of the blast by al-Asiri's body. The explosive device was hidden inside al-Asiri's rectum and anal canal, which security experts described as a novel technique. Such a device has since come to be known as a surgically implanted improvised explosive device (SIIED), or body cavity bomb (BCB). Muhammad bin Nayef appeared on state television with a bandage around two of his fingers on his left hand. He stated, "I did not want him to be searched, but he surprised me by blowing himself up."

According to Bruce Riedel, a former CIA officer and director of the Intelligence Project at the Brookings Institution, "the weight of the evidence I have seen is that [bin Nayef] was more injured in the assassination attempt than was admitted." To treat his injuries the prince "got onto a pain killer routine that was very addictive. I think that problem got progressively worse." According to The New York Times, citing  "an associate of the royal family", the prince's alleged addiction was cited to "strengthen support for the sudden change in the line of succession" that removed bin Nayef from office.

This was the first assassination attempt against a royal family member since 2003, when Saudi Arabia faced a sharp uptick in Al Qaeda-linked attacks. The last assassination attempt against Prince Muhammad was in August 2010.

Personal life
Muhammad bin Nayef is a son-in-law of Sultan bin Abdulaziz. His wife is Princess Reema bint Sultan Al Saud, and they have two daughters, Princess Sarah and Princess Lulua.

In April 2016 Muhammad bin Nayef was implicated in the Panama Papers leaks.

Awards
In 2015 Muhammad bin Nayef was awarded the George Tenet medal by the CIA.

On 4 March 2016 when he was crown prince he was awarded Légion d’honneur by then French president François Hollande citing his efforts in combating terrorism in the region.

Ancestry

Notes
 Footnotes

 References

External links
 

|-

|-

|-

|-

Muhammad
Muhammad
1959 births
Muhammad
Grand Officiers of the Légion d'honneur
Muhammad
Heirs apparent who never acceded
Muhammad
Living people
Muhammad
People named in the Panama Papers
Survivors of terrorist attacks
Muhammad